Temple Ohabei Shalom Cemetery is a historic Jewish cemetery located at 147 Wordsworth Street in East Boston, Massachusetts.

History
In 1844, Boston's first synagogue, the Temple Ohabei Shalom in Brookline, asked permission from the Boston City Council to purchase the lot as a burying place. This cemetery was the first legally established Jewish cemetery in the state. Prior to this, Jews from Boston were buried in more distant locations such as Touro Cemetery in Rhode Island.  In 1996, the Temple Ohabei Shalom ceded the property to the Jewish Cemetery Association.

It was added to the National Register of Historic Places in 2008.  It became the first Jewish cemetery to receive the honor.

Chapel
The cemetery is home to the oldest surviving Jewish chapel in Massachusetts, dedicated in 1903.  The Mystic River Jewish Project is currently restoring the Gothic Revival chapel for use as a museum.

Gallery

See also 
 National Register of Historic Places listings in northern Boston, Massachusetts

References

External links

 Profile at Jewish Cemetery Association
 Temple Ohabei Shalom Cemetery at Find a Grave

Jewish cemeteries in Massachusetts
Cemeteries in East Boston
Gothic Revival architecture in Massachusetts
Cemeteries on the National Register of Historic Places in Massachusetts
1844 establishments in Massachusetts
National Register of Historic Places in Boston
Jewish cemeteries in the United States